Seeker may refer to:

People
 Seekers, a 17th-century religious group, forerunner of the Quakers
 Seeker (Anabaptism), a person perceived by Anabaptists like the Amish and by Quakers as likely to become an adherent
 Seeker, a person seeking insight into ultimate or hidden truths through mysticism

Characters
Seeker (comics), a Marvel Comics character
Seeker (Well of Echoes), a character in the Well of Echoes series of novels
Seeker, Teela Brown's final partner in Ringworld
Seeker, species in The Elenium series of books

Novels
Seeker (Nicholson novel), a fantasy novel written by William Nicholson
Seeker (McDevitt novel), a science fiction novel by Jack McDevitt
Seeker (2015), by Arwen Elys Dayton

Vehicles
Seeker (spacecraft), a NASA CubeSat inspector
HMC Seeker, a 2001 customs cutter of the UK Border Agency
Denel Dynamics Seeker, a South African unmanned airborne vehicle

Other uses
Seeker (media company), part of Group Nine Media
Legend of the Seeker, a 2008 fantasy television series based on "The Sword of Truth" books by Terry Goodkind
Seeker, a role in the Quidditch game in the Harry Potter series of novels
"Seeker", a song by Audio Adrenaline from the album Kings & Queens, 2013

See also
Seekers (disambiguation)
The Seeker (disambiguation)